Sophronica reducta is a species of beetle in the family Cerambycidae. It was described by Francis Polkinghorne Pascoe in 1888.

References

Sophronica
Beetles described in 1888